Sciascia  is a Sicilian surname. It may refer to:

Places
 12380 Sciascia, an asteroid named after Leonardo Sciascia

People
 Filippo Sciascia (born 1972), Italian artist
 Gerlando Sciascia (1934–1999), Italian mobster
 Leonardo Sciascia (1921–1989), Italian writer, novelist, essayist, playwright and politician, born in Sicily
 Piri Sciascia (1946–2020), New Zealand Māori leader, kapa haka exponent and university administrator
 Salvatore Sciascia (1919–1986), Italian publisher

Italian-language surnames